Donnell Downey (12 April 1907 – 23 January 1966) was an Australian cricketer. He played one first-class match for South Australia in 1925/26.

See also
 List of South Australian representative cricketers

References

External links
 

1907 births
1966 deaths
Australian cricketers
South Australia cricketers
Cricketers from Adelaide